Mohammad Naved aka Qasim/Usman is a Pakistani man who was arrested in Udhampur, Jammu & Kashmir, for his alleged involvement with the terrorist organization Lashkar-e-Taiba. 
Meanwhile the National Investigation Agency (NIA) took over the Udhampur investigation. Naved is likely to be brought to Delhi for further questioning

References

Terrorism in Pakistan
Living people
Year of birth missing (living people)